Jack Hartman (born April 23, 1937) is a former American cyclist. He competed in the tandem event at the 1960 Summer Olympics. He later founded the Los Gatos Bicycle Racing Club (LGBRC) with Bob Tetzlaff in 1961.

References

External links
 

1937 births
Living people
American male cyclists
Olympic cyclists of the United States
Cyclists at the 1960 Summer Olympics
Sportspeople from Olympia, Washington